First Match is a 2018 American drama film written and directed by Olivia Newman, based on her 2010 short film of the same name. The film stars Elvire Emanuelle, Yahya Abdul-Mateen II, Colman Domingo, Jharrel Jerome, and Jared Kemp. The film premiered at the 2018 South by Southwest festival on March 12 where it won the Audience Award and the LUNA/Gamechanger Award. It was then released on Netflix on March 30, 2018.

Cast 
 Elvire Emanuelle as Monique
 Yahya Abdul-Mateen II as Darrel, Monique's father
 Colman Domingo as Coach Castile
Jharrel Jerome as Omari
 Jared Kemp as Malik
 Allen Maldonado as Juan

Reception

References

External links
 

2018 independent films
2010s sports drama films
2010s teen drama films
2018 films
American independent films
American teen drama films
Films set in Brooklyn
Films shot in New York City
English-language Netflix original films
Sport wrestling films
American sports drama films
Teen sports films
African-American drama films
2018 drama films
2018 directorial debut films
2010s English-language films
2010s American films